Zenon Walter Pylyshyn  (25 August 1937 – 6 December 2022) was a Canadian cognitive scientist and philosopher. He was a Canada Council Senior Fellow from 1963 to 1964.

Pylyshyn's research generally involved the theoretical analysis of the nature of the human cognitive systems behind perception, imagination, and reasoning.  He also continued to develop his visual indexing theory (sometimes called the FINST theory) which hypothesizes a preconceptual mechanism responsible for individuating, tracking, and directly (or demonstratively) referring to the visual properties encoded by cognitive processes.

Early life and education
Pylyshyn was born in Montreal, Quebec, Canada. He obtained a degree in Engineering Physics (BEng 1959) from McGill University and in control systems (MSc 1960) and experimental psychology (PhD 1963), both from the Regina Campus, University of Saskatchewan.  His dissertation was on the application of information theory to studies of human short-term memory.

Career
Pylyshyn  was a Canada Council Senior Fellow from 1963 to 1964. He was then professor of Psychology and Computer Science, at the University of Western Ontario in London, from 1964 until 1994, where he also held honorary positions in Philosophy and Electrical Engineering and was director of the UWO Center for Cognitive Science. From 1985 to 1994 he directed the Program in Artificial Intelligence and Robotics at the Canadian Institute for Advanced Research.

In 1994 he accepted positions as the Board of Governors Professor of Cognitive Science and as the director of the new Rutgers University Center for Cognitive Science in New Brunswick, New Jersey. In May 2016 Rutgers held a one-day "ZenFest", to commemorate his retirement.

Pylyshyn died, on 6 December 2022, at Calvary Hospital in New York City.

Awards and honors

In 1990, the Canadian Psychological Association awarded him the Donald O. Hebb Award for "distinguished contributions to psychology as a science."  He held fellowships in the American Association for Artificial Intelligence, the Center for Advanced Study in the Behavioral Sciences at Stanford University, the MIT Center for Cognitive Science, the Canadian Institute for Advanced Research, the Canadian Psychological Association, and was elected Fellow of the Royal Society of Canada in 1998. He was invited to give the Jean Nicod lectures in Paris in 2004. He has presided over both the Society for Philosophy and Psychology, and the Cognitive Science Society.

Selected publications

Articles

Books
 Computation and Cognition: Toward a Foundation for Cognitive Science (MIT Press, 1984) 
 Meaning and Cognitive Structure: Issues in the Computational Theory of Mind (Ablex Publishing, 1986) 
 The Robot's Dilemma: The Frame Problem in Artificial Intelligence (1987), Ablex Publishing, 1987) 
 Perspectives on the Computer Revolution (with Leon J. Bannon, Intellect 1988) 
 Computational Processes in Human Vision: An Interdisciplinary Perspective (ed. Zenon Pylyshyn, Intellect, 1988) 
 The Robot's Dilemma Revisited (ed. Zenon Pylyshyn, with K. M. Ford, Ablex, 1996) 
 Seeing and Visualizing: It's Not What You Think (MIT Press, 2004) 
 Things and Places: How the Mind Connects with the World (MIT Press, 2007) (Jean Nicod Lecture Series)

As co-author

See also
Connectionism

References

Citations

Works cited

External links
 

1937 births
Living people
20th-century Canadian philosophers
21st-century Canadian philosophers
Analytic philosophers
Canadian expatriates in the United States
Fellows of the Association for the Advancement of Artificial Intelligence
Fellows of the Cognitive Science Society
Fellows of the Royal Society of Canada
Jean Nicod Prize laureates
McGill University alumni
Rutgers University faculty
University of Saskatchewan alumni
Academic staff of the University of Western Ontario
Vision scientists